Guillaume Gélinas (born June 14, 1993) is a retired Canadian professional ice hockey defenceman. He last played for UK Elite Ice Hockey League (EIHL) side Belfast Giants in Northern Ireland.

Playing career
Gelinas played junior hockey for the Val-d'Or Foreurs of the Quebec Major Junior Hockey League from the 2009–10 season. He received the Emile Bouchard Trophy as the league's best defenceman  during the 2013–14 QMJHL season  but was not selected in the NHL draft.

On July 1, 2014, Gelinas signed a three-year entry level contract with the Minnesota Wild.

At the conclusion of his entry-level deal with the Wild, after primarily spending the final 2016–17 season with secondary ECHL affiliate, the Quad City Mallards, Gelinas was not to be tendered a new contract with the Wild. As a free agent, Gelinas signed a one-year deal with Slovakian club, HC ’05 Banská Bystrica, on May 18, 2017.

Awards and honours

References

External links 
 

1993 births
Living people
Canadian ice hockey defencemen
French Quebecers
Ice hockey people from Quebec City
Iowa Wild players
Belfast Giants players
Quad City Mallards (ECHL) players
Val-d'Or Foreurs players
Canadian expatriate ice hockey players in the United States
Canadian expatriate ice hockey players in Northern Ireland
Canadian expatriate ice hockey players in Slovakia